The capital of the United States is Washington, D.C.

United States capital may also refer to:
 A misspelling of United States Capitol, the building that houses the legislative branch of the United States government
 Any city on the list of capitals in the United States, including state, territorial, and former national capitals